Kuana Torres Kahele (born September 7, 1978) is a Hawaiian musician, vocalist, songwriter, record producer, dancer, and educator from Hilo, Hawaii. Known primarily for his original acoustic compositions, Kahele arranges traditional Hawaiian music as well, performing and recording with instruments such as ʻukulele, guitar, ipu, and bass (to name a few). The majority of his lyrics are written and performed in the Hawaiian language. After learning Kane Hula and Haku Mele (Hawaiian composing) in his teens, in 1995 Kahele co-founded Nā Palapalai, a Hawaiian music group that has released a number of albums. Several have charted in the top five on the Billboard Top World Albums chart, and the group has won a large number of Nā Hōkū Hanohano Awards, including Group of the Year.

Kahele released his first solo album, Kaunaloa, in 2011, which reached No. 2 on the Top World Albums Chart and won Kahele five Nā Hōkū Hanohano Awards, including Male Vocalist of the Year. He has released several charting solo albums since, and in 2014 released two volumes from his Music for the Hawaiian Islands series. Also in 2014 Kahele voiced the lead character in Lava, an animated short film by Pixar. Kahele regularly teaches cultural workshops around the world. In Japan he runs the Kuana School of Hawaiian Music & Culture, teaching 200+ students in Tokyo, Fukuoka and Osaka.

Discography

Group albums 
 1999: Akoni And Da Palapalai Patch: Kaona
 1999: Johnny Lum Ho: Hālau O Ka Ua Kani Lehua
 2002: Nā Palapalai: Makani ʻOluʻolu
 2003: Nā Palapalai: Hula Leʻa Magazine Vol. 3 (Japan)
 2004: Nā Palapalai: Keʻala Beauty
 2006: Nā Palapalai: Ka Pua Hae Hawaiʻi
 2007: Johnny Lum Ho: Canʻt You Hear Me Calling?
 2007: Nā Palapalai: Disneyʻs Hawaiian Album (E Komo Mai)
 2009: Nā Palapalai: Nanea
 2010: Nā Palapalai: Best Of Nā Palapalai
 2012: Nā Palapalai: Haʻa
 2018: Nā Palapalai DVD: Hoʻopili Hou
 2020: Nā Palapalai: Back To The Patch
 2020: Nā Palapalai: Ka Nani Vol. 1
 2020: Nā Palapalai: Ka Nani Vol. 2
 2020: Nā Palapalai: Greatest Hula Hits

Solo albums 
 2011: Kaunaloa
 2012: Hilo for the Holidays
 2013: Kahele
 2014: ʻOhai Aliʻi (Single)
 2014: Music For The Hawaiian Islands: Vol. 1 Hawai'i Keawe (Hawai'i Island)
 2014: Music For The Hawaiian Islands: Vol. 2 Kahelelani (Ni'ihau)
 2015: Music For The Hawaiian Islands: Vol. 3 Pi'ilani (Maui)
 2015: Music For The Hawaiian Islands: Vol. 4 Manookalanipō (Kaua'i)
 2017: Music For The Hawaiian Islands: Vol. 5 Lānaʻikaʻula (Lānaʻi)
 2017: Music For The Hawaiian Islands: Vol. 6 ʻĀina Momona (Molokaʻi)
 2018: Back To Hilo For The Holidays
 2019: Music For The Hawaiian Islands: Vol. 7 Kākuhihewa (Oʻahu)
 2021: Nani Waiʻale

Filmography

See also 
 Music of Hawaii

References

External links 
 

Living people
1978 births
Hawaiian ukulele players
American male bass guitarists
American male composers
21st-century American composers
Guitarists from Hawaii
Record producers from Hawaii
Songwriters from Hawaii
Native Hawaiian musicians
Mountain Apple Company artists
People from Hilo, Hawaii
Hula dancers
21st-century American bass guitarists
21st-century American male musicians
American male songwriters